Ruth is an unincorporated community in Fulton County, Arkansas, United States.

References

Unincorporated communities in Fulton County, Arkansas
Unincorporated communities in Arkansas